The 2015 U.S. Classic, officially the 2015 Secret U.S. Classic, is the 32nd edition of the U.S. Classic and was held on July 25, 2015 at Sears Centre Arena in Chicago, Illinois.

The event served as a qualification event to the 2015 U.S. National Gymnastics Championships, later in August 2015. It was the second event during the 2015 USA Gymnastics elite season.

Medalists

Event information 
The 32nd edition of the U.S. Classic, in 2015, was held at the Sears Centre Arena, just outside Chicago, in Hoffman Estates, Illinois. This is the third time it was held at the arena but the event has been held in Chicago since 2010, when it was hosted at the UIC Pavilion.

The Junior session started at 13:00pm CT and the Senior session started at 18:30pm CT.

Sponsorship 
The 2015 U.S. Classic was the third edition of the event under the title sponsorship of American deodorant brand, Secret.

Broadcast 
Universal Sports own the broadcasting rights to all USA Gymnastics events and broadcast the Senior competition only, as normal.

Qualification to the Classic 
To advance to the U.S. Classic and qualify to international elite status, a gymnast must have either;

 scored 53.00 (Sr.) or 51.50 (Jr.) at the 2014 P&G U.S. National Championships
 scored 53.00 (Sr.) or 51.50 (Jr.) at a 2015 National Qualifier event
 be a U.S. National team member and represented the U.S. at an international assignment

Qualification to Nationals 
The 2015 U.S. Classic was a qualifier to the 2015 P&G U.S. National Championships in Indianapolis, Indiana. In order to qualify to U.S. Nationals from this year's classic, senior gymnasts must score 54.00 and juniors must score 52.50.

Results

Seniors

Juniors

Participants

Seniors 
There were 20 gymnasts competing in the senior division.

 Kyla Ross UCLA 2017
 Maggie Nichols OU 2017
 Marissa Oakley georgia 2018
 Taylor Lawson stanford 2018
 Aly Raisman professional
 Lexy Ramler minnesota 2018
 Sabrina Vega georgia 2017
 Gabby Douglas Professional
 Brenna Dowell ou 2015
 Polina Shchennikova michigan 2017
 Lauren Navarro stanford 2018
 Alaina Kwan kentucky 2018
 Kylie Dickson alabama 2018
 Nia Dennis UCLA 2017
 Ashton Locklear Professional
 Bailie Key alabama 2018
 Madison Kocian UCLA 2017
 Simone BilesProfessional
 Mykayla Skinner utah
 Alyssa Baumann florida

Juniors 
There were 37 gymnasts competing in the junior division.

 Ragan Smith ou 2019
 Caitlin Smith
 Morgan Hurd florida 2021
 Abigail Walker penn state 2021
 Sydney Johnson-Scharpf florida 2019
 Jordan Chiles ucla 2021 
 Grace Quinncal 2019
 Colbi Flory no committment
 Olivia Dunnelsu 2021
 Elena Arenas lsu 2021
 Emma Malabuyo ucla 2022
 Aria Brusch auburn 2020
 Chae Campbell ucla 2021
 Maile O'Keefe utah 2020
 Kaitlin DeGuzman kentucky 2020
 Maggie Musselmanno comittment
 Gabby Perea cal 2021
 Jaylene Gilstrap utah 2021
 Deanne Soza utah 2021
 Jazmyn Foberg florida 2021
 Lauren Hernandez professional
 Adriana Popp boise state 2020 
 Megan Freed
 Hannah Joyner utah 2023
 Alyssa Al-Ashariniu 2021
 Trinity ThomasFlorida 2019
 Tienna Nguyen NC state 2022
 Madison Rau lsu 2019
  Christina Desiderio lsu 2019
 Shania Adams alabama 2021
 Adeline Kenlin iowa 2021
 Tori Tatum lsu 2022 
 Abby Paulson utah 2020
 Anna Huber florida 2021
 Alyona Shchennikovalsu 2020
 Emily Gaskins alabama 2019
 Shilese Jones florida

References 

2015 in gymnastics
U.S. Classic
2015 in sports in Illinois
Sports competitions in Chicago